The 2018 Brisbane International was a tournament on the 2018 ATP World Tour and 2018 WTA Tour. It was played on outdoor hard courts in Brisbane, Queensland, Australia. It was the tenth edition of the tournament and took place at the Queensland Tennis Centre in Tennyson. It was held from 31 December 2017 to 7 January 2018 as part of the Australian Open Series in preparation for the first Grand Slam of the year. Rafael Nadal and Andy Murray were about to start their 2018 seasons at the tournament, but both withdrew due to continuous injuries. On 5 October 2017, defending champions Grigor Dimitrov and Karolína Plíšková announced they would also compete.

Points and prize money

Point distribution

Prize money 

1Qualifiers prize money is also the Round of 32 prize money.
*per team

ATP singles main-draw entrants

Seeds 

 1 Rankings are as of 25 December 2017.

Other entrants 
The following players received wildcards into the singles main draw:
  Alex de Minaur
  John Millman
  Jordan Thompson

The following players received entry from the qualifying draw:
  Ernesto Escobedo
  Michael Mmoh
  Peter Polansky
  John-Patrick Smith

The following player received entry as a lucky loser:
  Yannick Hanfmann

Withdrawals 
Before the tournament
  Andy Murray → replaced by  Yannick Hanfmann
  Rafael Nadal → replaced by  Matthew Ebden
  Kei Nishikori → replaced by  Frances Tiafoe

Retirements 
  Denis Istomin

ATP doubles main-draw entrants

Seeds 

 1 Rankings are as of 25 December 2017.

Other entrants 
The following pair received a wildcard into the doubles main draw:
  Lleyton Hewitt /  Jordan Thompson

Withdrawals 
During the tournament
  Ryan Harrison

WTA singles main-draw entrants

Seeds 

 1 Rankings are as of 25 December 2017.

Other entrants 
The following players received wildcards into the singles main draw:
  Destanee Aiava
  Ajla Tomljanović

The following players received entry from the qualifying draw:
  Kateryna Bondarenko
  Jennifer Brady
  Kaia Kanepi
  Aliaksandra Sasnovich

The following player received entry as a lucky loser:
  Heather Watson

Withdrawals
Before the tournament
  Petra Kvitová → replaced by  Heather Watson
  Magdaléna Rybáriková → replaced by  Catherine Bellis
  Sloane Stephens (knee injury) → replaced by  Ana Konjuh
  Elena Vesnina → replaced by  Tatjana Maria

Retirements
  Caroline Garcia
  Johanna Konta
  Garbiñe Muguruza

WTA doubles main-draw entrants

Seeds 

 1 Rankings are as of 25 December 2017.

Other entrants 
The following pairs received a wildcard into the doubles main draw:
  Priscilla Hon /  Ajla Tomljanović
  Madison Keys /  Heather Watson

The following pair received entry as an alternate:
  Sorana Cîrstea /  Anastasija Sevastova

Withdrawals 
Before the tournament
  Carla Suárez Navarro

Champions

Men's singles 

  Nick Kyrgios def.  Ryan Harrison, 6–4, 6–2

Women's singles 

  Elina Svitolina def.  Aliaksandra Sasnovich, 6–2, 6–1

Men's doubles 

  Henri Kontinen /  John Peers def.  Leonardo Mayer /  Horacio Zeballos, 3–6, 6–3, [10–2]

Women's doubles 

  Kiki Bertens /  Demi Schuurs def.  Andreja Klepač /  María José Martínez Sánchez, 7–5, 6–2

References

External links 
 

 
2018